The Nature Conservancy of Canada (NCC) is a private, non-profit, charitable nature conservation and restoration organization based in Canada. Since its founding in 1962, the organization and its partners have protected  of land and water across Canada, which includes the natural habitat of more than a quarter of the country’s endangered species. With offices in each province, NCC works at a local level with stakeholders and partners to secure parcels of land.

Major milestones and campaigns

NCC’s first conservation project was the Cavan Swamp and Bog (now the Cavan Swamp Wildlife Area) west of Peterborough, Ontario, in 1968. The 1,340-hectare site provides habitat for a variety of species, including 22 types of orchids. The organization’s first project outside Ontario was Sight Point on Cape Breton Island, Nova Scotia, in 1971. 

The organization has now conserved more than 1,000 properties from coast to coast to coast, including the 5,300-hectare Old Man on His Back Prairie and Heritage Conservation Area in Saskatchewan, the 11,000-hectare Waterton Park Front in Alberta, and the 55,000-hectare Darkwoods Conservation Area in British Columbia, the largest single private conservation project in Canadian history. The Darkwoods Forest Carbon Project is NCC’s third-party certified carbon credit program. 

NCC has spearheaded several campaigns to raise awareness and funding for evidence-based nature conservation. The Natural Areas Conservation Program (NACP), launched in 2007, was a public-private partnership between the Government of Canada and NCC, along with program partners Ducks Unlimited Canada and Canada’s land trusts. Administered by NCC, the program allowed partners to match federal investment at a two-to-one with contributions from foundations, corporations, individuals and other levels of government. In 2019, the NACP was succeeded by the Natural Heritage Conservation Program (NHCP), a four-year partnership with a $100 million commitment from the federal government. To date, this important partnership has leveraged nearly $400 million in investment from the Government of Canada with more than $800 million in matching contributions. The result is more $1.2 billion in conservation outcomes including the protection of nearly 700,000 hectares for more than 200 species at risk — an area slightly larger than Banff National Park. 

Launched in 2007, the Force For Nature Campaign raised more than $500 million for land conservation, with Ryan Reynolds, Jason Priestley, William Shatner and other Canadian celebrities appearing in a series of commercials promoting the campaign.  

The Landmark Campaign launched in 2013 with a goal of raising $750 million for conservation across Canada. It was completed in 2020 with more than 110,000 donors contributing. The Landmark Campaign resulted in 540 new conservation projects completed across Canada, totaling 115,000 square kilometers and protecting habitat for 130 species at risk, including seven that are endemic — meaning they are found only in Canada.

In April 2022 the NCC announced its largest project to date: the Boreal Wildlands. The 145,000-hectare site consists of more than 100 freshwater lakes, rivers and streams, peatlands, swamps, and mixed forest. 
Located near the town of Hearst in Northern Ontario, the area is home to species of flora and fauna, including lynx, black bear, moose, and the threatened boreal caribou, as well as hundreds of species of migratory and resident birds. 
The carbon sequestered in the soil and trees is estimated to be equivalent to the lifetime emissions of three million cars. 
NCC is purchasing the land from pulp and paper manufacturer Domtar. Once completed, it will be the largest private land conservation project in Canada’s history. As of May 2022, the NCC has raised 70% of its $46-million goal to purchase and maintain the land. 
The Boreal Wildlands project is within the Treaty 9 (James Bay Treaty) lands.

Collaboration with Indigenous communities

NCC formally acknowledges that “Indigenous Peoples have protected and cared for the natural areas, plants and wildlife that have sustained them for millennia and NCC has much to learn from Indigenous Peoples across Canada that will help us to become better land managers and conservationists.”  

Collaborative projects include the Gámdis Tlagee Conservation Area in Haida Gwaii, BC, working with the Haida Nation, to the Cascumpec and Conway Sandhills projects in conjunction with L’Nuey, the Mi’kmaq Rights Initiative on PEI.  

In 2014, NCC launched "Learning the Land" in partnership with several Indigenous schools to bridge the understanding between Indigenous and scientific worldviews. In 2019 that partnership was further formalized under the NCC’s Indigenous Conservation Engagement Framework.

Access to nature

Most properties held by NCC are open to the public. Under the Nature Destinations umbrella, there are more than 30 signature sites across the country — with at least one site in each province — that are open to the public. Each represents a notable example of an intact natural landscape.

Volunteerism
The Conservation Volunteers program is the only national conservation volunteering program. Volunteer projects range from clearing trash and invasive species management on NCC properties, to a variety of citizen science projects to help better understand biodiversity across the country.

Funding and private donations
In addition to funding from various levels of government, NCC’s accepts donations from individuals, foundations and corporations. Landowners can also donate ecologically important properties to the organization and receive tax incentives in return under the Ecogift program.

Leadership 
After serving as president and CEO of NCC for 23 years, John Lounds retired from the role in 2020. NCC’s current president and CEO is Catherine Grenier.

Honours and awards
In 2020, NCC was selected as one of “Canada’s best charities” by Maclean’s magazine and in 2021 was added to Charity Intelligence’s “Top 100 Charities.”  Other accolades include consistently ranking at the top of the MoneySense Charity 100, an annual list that ranks Canadian charities on their finances and transparency, from 2010 to 2019, a four-star rating from Charity Intelligence in 2019 and making the Financial Post’s “Charities of the Year” list in 2014, 2015 and 2017.

Media
NCC produces a quarterly magazine, the Nature Conservancy of Canada Magazine. The organization also has a blog called Land Lines — ranked as one of the “Top 100 Nature Blogs” in 2021 — and is active on social media, including on Twitter (@NCC_CNC) and Instagram (ncc_cnc).

References

External links
 Nature Conservancy of Canada website
 Nature Destinations
 Conservation Volunteers
 Conservation Internship Program
 Donation Options

Nature conservation organizations based in Canada
Environmental organizations based in Ontario
Land trusts
Charities based in Canada
1962 in the environment
Organizations established in 1962
1962 establishments in Canada
Organizations based in Toronto